Bad Luck is a 1960 Polish Tragicomedy film directed by Andrzej Munk.   The screenplay is based on Jerzy Stawiński’s novel Six Incarnations of Jan Piszczyk (1959).

Bad Luck was entered into the 1960 Cannes Film Festival.

Plot

Bad Luck reflects the episodic source material by novelist Jerzy Stawiński from which it is adapted. Jan Piszczyk is petty bourgeois Jew and son of a Warsaw tailor. The story opens when the middle-aged Piszczyk is laid off from a job, and bemoans his fate. He provides a retrospective on his life in a series of flashbacks, spanning the history of Poland from the rise of fasict anti-Semitism during the 1920s to the postwar Stalinist period. Piszczyk emerges as a political and social chameleon, willing to accommodate himself to any situation. His opportunism propels him repeatedly into ludicrous and pathetic failures.

Cast
 Bogumił Kobiela – Jan Piszczyk
 Maria Ciesielska – Basia
 Helena Dąbrowska – Wychówna
 Barbara Lass – Jola Wrona-Wrońska (as Barbara Kwiatkowska)
 Krystyna Karkowska – Wrona-Wrońska
 Barbara Połomska – Zosia Jelonkowa
 Irena Stalończyk – Irena Kropaczynska
 Tadeusz Bartosik – Wasik
 Henryk Bak – Director
 Mariusz Dmochowski – UB Officer
 Aleksander Dzwonkowski – Cezary Piszczyk
 Edward Dziewoński – Jelonek
 Tadeusz Janczar – Ens. Sawicki
 Stanisław Jaworski – Watchmaker
 Andrzej Krasicki – Witold Kropaczyński
 Wojciech Lityński – Young Jan Piszczyk
 Kazimierz Opaliński – Prison Governor
 Jerzy Pichelski – Maj. Wrona-Wronski
 Adam Pawlikowski – Ens. Osewski
 Witold Sadowy – soldier pretending to be Adolf Hitler
 Wojciech Siemion – Józef Kacperski
 Maria Kaniewska - Anastazja Makulec
 Jan Tadeusz Stanisławski – Chief Scout
 Tadeusz Waczkowski – Manager Kozienicki

Continuation
In 1988, the film Citizen Piszczyk was made, directed by Andrzej Kotkowski. Jerzy Stuhr played the main role.

References

Sources 
Niemitz, Dorota. 2014. The legacy of postwar Polish filmmaker Andrzej Munk. World Socialist Web Site. 13 October, 2014. https://www.wsws.org/en/articles/2014/10/13/munk-o13.html Retrieved 08 July, 2022.

External links
 
 Bad Luck at the Filmpolski.pl 

1960 films
1960 comedy films
1960s Polish-language films
Polish black-and-white films
Films directed by Andrzej Munk
Polish comedy films